Call Me Mr. Brown is a 1986 Australian movie based on the 1971 Qantas bomb hoax, written and directed by South Australian director Scott Hicks.

In the 1971 incident, Peter Macari extorted $500,000 from Australian airline Qantas, threatening to blow up flight 755 from Sydney to Hong Kong on 26 May 1971.

Qantas actively tried to stop the film being made and despite failing to do so, Network 10, which had invested A$250,000 in the film, refused to air it. The film was eventually released on video in 1990.

References

External links

Call Me Mr. Brown at Oz Movies

Australian crime drama films
Qantas
Films directed by Scott Hicks
1986 films
1980s English-language films
1980s Australian films